An editor-at-large is a journalist who contributes content to a publication. Sometimes such an editor is called a roving reporter or roving editor.
Unlike an editor who works on a publication from day to day and is hands-on, an editor-at-large contributes content on a semi-regular basis and has less of a say in matters such as layout, pictures or the publication's direction.

Editor at large is a term often used in fashion magazines, usually appointing long-term editors or celebrities. Notable examples are Andre Leon Talley of Vogue and Anna Dello Russo of Vogue Japan.

Preferences and purpose
Editors-at-large are more independent; they are allowed their own preferences in the content they have to generate, and they do not always have to pitch their ideas to the main editor. Though they are still subject to the direction and oversight of chief editors and executive editors, they frequently come up with ideas for other writers to research and write. "At large" means the editor has no specific assignments, but rather works on whatever interests them.

The position of editor-at-large is not a standing role at most publications. Instead, it is created on an as-needed basis.

The most common reason for appointing an editor-at-large is when an editor with extensive experience and long association with the publication, who has been in the role of editor for a very long time, is replaced by a new editor but kept on board by being given the title of editor-at-large.

This can be because the editor desires to go back to writing rather than stay in a largely 'management' role; because the long-time editor is burnt out and perhaps not performing; because a new editor with a different skillset or a different focus is needed; or a new publisher takes over and decides a new editor is called for.

The title of editor-at-large is offered as a way to keep the outgoing editor at the publication rather than lose his or her skills, connections and readership appeal, especially if the outgoing editor could be employed by a competing publication. Such as André Lean Talley (died 2022) for Vogue, Diane WellPeth for Elle or Arnaud Henry Salas-Perez for Visionaire.

Types of editors